Tandlianwala (Punjabi) is a city and Tehsil in Punjab, Pakistan. It is located 50 km from the city of Faisalabad and 44 km from city of Okara. It is a sub-division of Faisalabad District and has a Tehsil Municipal Administration (TMA).

History
Tandlianwala was established as a Mandi, meaning market, during the colonization of west Punjab. In 1887, it was given the status of "sub tehsil". The town committee came into being during 1965. During 1966-1990, the town expanded rapidly because of the construction of a bridge over the Ravi River. Before the independence of Pakistan, the city was a food supply source for villages in nearby areas. The old name of the city was Tandla Mandi, meaning Tandla Market.

Geography
The Ravi River flows about 9 km in the east, and is the main source of irrigation, meeting the requirements of 90% of cultivated land.

There are no natural boundaries between Tandlianwala and the adjoining tehsil & its districts. The city is bordered on the north by Faisalabad and on the east by Okara and Sahiwal and in the West and South west is district Toba Tek Singh and on the north and by Samundri at North east of tandlianwala is tehsil Jaranwala.

Geology
Tandlianwala is part of the alluvial plains, between the Himalayan foothills and the central core of the Indian subcontinent. The alluvial deposits are typically over a thousand feet thick. The scalloped interfluves are believed to have been formed during the Late Pleistocene period and feature flat-topped river terraces. These were later identified as old and young floodplains of the River Ravi on the Kamalia and Chenab Plains. The old floodplains consist of Holocene deposits from the River Ravi. There is also a small river passing through the center of the city.

The soil consists of young stratified silt loams or very fine sand loams which gave the subsoil a very weak structure with common kankers at only five feet. The course of the rivers within Tandlianwala Tehsil are winding and often subject to frequent alternations. In the rainy season, the currents are very strong. This leads to high floods in certain areas which last for a number of days. The Rakh Branch and Gogera Branch canals have changed the water levels in the district however the belt on the River Ravi has remained narrow. The river bed includes the river channels which have shifted the sand bars and low sandy levees leading to river erosion.

Demographics
As per the Population Census Report of 1998, the town is spread over an area of 1284 Square Kilometers with a total population of 5,40,802 which has increased by 702,733 by 2017, indicating that the growth rate of the city is 3.37 percent per annum. Before the partition there was a majority of Sikh & Hindus in the city, most of whom then migrated to India. After the partition, the settlement of Muslim refugees from East Punjab and Haryana people increased, hailing from India. There are other two urban localities in Tandlianwala Municipal committee: Mamoon Kanjan and Kanjwani. The city has 28 Union Councils in total, with 3 Urban Councils and 25 Rural Union Councils.

There is a police force in the city which was established in 1905 by British settlers, covering an area of 680 sq. kilometres. There are four police stations: City Tandlianwala, Sadar Tandlianwala, Police Station Garh and Police Station Bahlak Thana.

Religion and ethnic groups
The majority religion is Islam, making up 98% of the city with small minorities of Christians (1.8%) and others (0.2%), mainly Sikhs and Ahmadis. The majority of Muslims belong to the Sunni, Hanafi, and Barelvi schools of thought with a minority of Shiites.

Climate
Tandlianwala has a hot desert climate (BWh) in the Köppen-Geiger classification.

The summer season starts in April and continues until October. May, June and July are the hottest months. The winter season starts from November and continues until March. December, January and February are the coldest months.

Sports
Tandlianwala has a lot of sports like Cricket, Football and Volley Ball. The boys of Tandlianwala commonly play cricket during the evening in various places, mostly at the grounds of MC High School and in Barlab Hockey Ground also known locally as the Doonga (D ground) Ground. Recently a new Cricket stadium is also construed at national standards.

There is also a hockey stadium under construction, which will be built to the national standard level.

Agriculture
The city is well known because of the high quality of the Sugarcane produced there. It has two sugar mills and dozens of cotton factories, rice factories and flour mills. The city is traditionally known for pure Desi Ghee, though it is rare now.

The people of this city had an active part in the struggle for the independence of Pakistan (Freedom Movement). The city was originally developed around a grain market. Its police force was established in 1905 and prior to that only a police checkpost existed.

Politically, it is one of the most prominent Tehsils of Faisalabad District. Mian Manzoor Wattoo, a former chief minister of Punjab was elected from this constituency in 1993, while he lost in his home constituency.

Economics
Tandlianwala is home to a major grain, whole corn & sugar market. Mahi Chowk is the main commercial market of the city. Other markets in the city include Ghala Mandi, Rail Bazar, Nehar Bazar, Naya Bazar, Anarkali Bazar, Quaid-e-Azam Road (Samundri Road), Faisalabad Road, etc.

Major banks and offices in Tandlianwala Tehsil:
 National Bank of Pakistan
 Bank of Punjab
 Zarai Taraqiati Bank Limited
 Habib Bank Limited
 Allied Bank Limited
 MCB Bank Limited
 United Bank Limited
 TCS Courier Limited

Transport
 Tandliawala railway station

Notable people
Rai Ahmad Khan Kharal Shaheed from Jhamra; a freedom fighter
Naz Khialvi, lyricist and radio host and presenter.

References

Faisalabad District
Tehsils of Punjab, Pakistan